The Art of Parties is a song by the British band Japan.

It was released as a single in May 1981 and reached number 48 on the UK Singles Chart. A re-recorded version was subsequently included as the opening track on the band's album Tin Drum released later in 1981. A live version of the song is included on Japan's 1983 album Oil on Canvas and on the DVD release The Very Best of Japan.

Personnel
On "The Art of Parties":
 David Sylvian — lead vocals, guitars, treated piano, brass arrangements
 Richard Barbieri — synthesizers
 Mick Karn — fretless bass, brass arrangements
 Steve Jansen — drums, percussion
 backing vocals – Jay Yates, Pearly Gates, Ruby James
 horns — Cliff Hardy, Martin Drover, Mel Collins

On "Life Without Buildings":
 David Sylvian — lead vocals, synthetic brass
 Richard Barbieri — synthesizers, tapes
 Mick Karn — fretless bass, finger cymbals
 Steve Jansen — drums, acoustic and synthetic percussion

Track listings
7": Virgin / VS 409 (UK)
"The Art of Parties" – 3.55
"Life Without Buildings" – 6:40

12": Virgin / VS 409-12 (UK)
"The Art of Parties" – 6.41
"Life Without Buildings" – 6.40

7": Virgin / VS 409 / VIPX-1580 (Australia and Japan)
"The Art of Parties" – 3.55
"My New Career" – 3.52
12": Virgin / VS 409-12 (Australia)

 "The Art of Parties" – 6:41
 "My New Career" – 3:52

EP: Virgin / VEP 305 (Canada)

"The Art of Parties" – 6:41
"The Width of a Room" – 3:14
"Life Without Buildings" – 6:40
"The Experience of Swimming" – 4:06

7" Promo: Virgin / 0267 (Spain, 1982)

 "The Art of Parties" (album version) – 4:11
 "Visions of China" – 3:55

References

1981 singles
1981 songs
Japan (band) songs
Songs written by David Sylvian
Virgin Records singles
Song recordings produced by John Punter